Alcoa is the company formerly known as Aluminum Company of America.

Alcoa may also refer to:

Alorton, Illinois, formerly known as Alcoa
Alcoa, Tennessee, named for the company
Alcoa Power Generating, a subsidiary of Alcoa Inc., in Pittsburgh, Pennsylvania
Alcoa River
Alcoa World Alumina and Chemicals
ALCOA (attributable, legible, contemporaneously recorded, original or a true copy, and accurate); see GxP

See also
United States v. Alcoa (2d Cir. 1945), a landmark antitrust decision in the United States
 (several ships)